Vanesa Krauth (born 20 May 1981) is an Argentine former tennis player.

In her career, Krauth won two singles and ten doubles titles on the ITF Women's Circuit. She has career-high WTA rankings of 223 in singles, achieved on 18 March 2002, and 174 in doubles, set on 4 February 2002.

She made her main-draw debut on the WTA Tour at the 2001 Copa Colsanitas, in the doubles event, partnering twin sister Erica Krauth.

Krauth retired from professional tennis 2002.

ITF finals

Singles (2–3)

Doubles (10–9)

External links
 
 

1981 births
Living people
Argentine female tennis players
People from Luján, Buenos Aires
Sportspeople from Buenos Aires Province
21st-century Argentine women